Zsuzsanna Veress (born 6 March 1976 in Békéscsaba) is a former Hungarian handball goalkeeper who most recently played for Békéscsabai Előre NKSE.

Achievements
Magyar Kupa:
Silver Medalist: 2012
Bronze Medalist: 2010

References

External links
 Zsuzsanna Veress player profile on Békéscsabai Előre NKSE Official Website
 Zsuzsanna Veress career statistics at Worldhandball

1976 births
Living people
Békéscsabai Előre NKSE players
Hungarian female handball players
People from Békéscsaba
Sportspeople from Békés County